Ben Barry (born February 9, 1983) is a Canadian entrepreneur, academic, author, and women's health advocate. He is currently the Dean of Fashion at the New School. Ben is the founder and CEO of the Ben Barry Agency, a modelling agency and consultancy known for its use of diverse models, and the author of the Canadian bestseller Fashioning Reality: A New Generation of Entrepreneurship. His television profiles include The Oprah Winfrey Show, CNN, MTV, and CBC among others. Barry has been featured in The Boston Globe, The Guardian, The Times of India, The Globe and Mail, and the Financial Times. Michaëlle Jean, the Governor-General of Canada, has described his work as, "positive, determined action to undo stereotypes and redefine society's idea of beauty."

Early life and career

Barry was born in Ottawa, Ontario. He attended the Elmwood School before moving on to Ashbury College, and graduated from the University of Toronto, where he was a member of Trinity College, in 2005 with a BA in Women's Studies and Political Science. He later attended the University of Cambridge and completed an MPhil in Innovation, Strategy, and Organization in 2007 and a PhD with an Ogilvy Foundation research grant at Cambridge Judge Business School in 2012. Barry's second book, Beyond Beauty: Discovering, Challenging, and Refining Beauty, will examine perceptions of beauty across the world and will be based on his Ph.D. research. He is the Chair of the Board of Directors of the Toronto Fashion Incubator, and sits on the Board of the Canadian Foundation for Women's Health. Barry was an assistant professor of equity, inclusivity, and diversity in fashion at the Toronto Metropolitan University School of Fashion before being promoted to Chair of the School of Fashion in 2018. In 2021, he was hired as the new Dean of Fashion at the New School in New York City, New York, USA. He also writes a bi-weekly small business column for The Globe and Mail, Canada's national newspaper of record.

Ben Barry Agency

He began the Ben Barry Agency at the age of 14. The Agency is known for its use of diverse models; those of widely different sizes, races, ages, and abilities. This is in contrast to most modelling agencies which impose strict height, weight, and age requirements. The Agency played a critical role in the Dove Campaign for Real Beauty. Barry has been acknowledged for his efforts to reform the fashion industry to more accurately represent women's diversity, and to end the use of a standard physical beauty ideal.

Awards

He is a recipient of the Queen's Golden Jubilee Medal and the first male recipient of the Governor General's Awards in Commemoration of the Persons Case. Maclean's named him one of "one of twenty-five leaders of tomorrow".

References

External links
 Ben Barry Agency
 Ben Barry at Speakers Spotlight

Businesspeople from Ottawa
Canadian non-fiction writers
1983 births
Trinity College (Canada) alumni
University of Toronto alumni
Living people
Governor General's Award in Commemoration of the Persons Case winners
Male feminists
Alumni of the University of Cambridge
Writers from Ottawa